Nesareh-ye Olya (also Romanized as Nesāreh-ye ‘Olyā; also known as Nasreh Būzūrg, Naşreh-ye Bozorg, Nesār Bālā, Nesār-e-Bālā, Nesāreh-ye Bālā, Nesāreh-ye Bozorg, and Nesāreh-ye Kaūrā) is a village in Howmeh Rural District, in the Central District of Divandarreh County, Kurdistan Province, Iran. At the 2006 census, its population was 1,187, in 259 families. The village is populated by Kurds.

References 

Towns and villages in Divandarreh County
Kurdish settlements in Kurdistan Province